Florence is an unincorporated community in Rutherford County, in the U.S. state of Tennessee.

History
A variant name was "Florence Station". A post office called Florence Station was established in 1867, the name was changed to Florence in 1894, and the post office closed in 1937. The community once contained a schoolhouse.

References

Unincorporated communities in Rutherford County, Tennessee
Unincorporated communities in Tennessee